At the 2000 Summer Olympics, four volleyball events were contested – men's and women's indoor volleyball, and men's and women's beach volleyball.

Medal table

Medal summary

References

External links
Volleyball

 
2000 Summer Olympics events
O
O
2000
International volleyball competitions hosted by Australia